Etna (formerly Carthage) is an unincorporated community and census-designated place (CDP) in Licking County, Ohio, United States. As of the 2010 census it had a population of 1,215. It was listed as a census-designated place in 2010.

Geography
Etna is in southwestern Licking County, in the center of Etna Township. U.S. Route 40 forms the northern edge of the community, and Interstate 70 forms the southern edge. Access from I-70 is via Exit 118 (State Route 310). Both US 40 and I-70 lead west  to Columbus and east  to Zanesville.

Etna's surface area drains northeast to the South Fork of the Licking River, an east-flowing tributary of the Muskingum River and part of the Ohio River watershed.

Demographics

History
Etna was originally called "Carthage", under which name it was laid out in 1832 when the National Road was being built to that point. The present name is derived from Etna Township. A post office called Etna has been in operation since 1833.

References

Census-designated places in Licking County, Ohio
1832 establishments in Ohio
Populated places established in 1832